Jean Bart was a  74-gun ship of the line of the French Navy.

Career 
Ordered in 1811, Jean Bart was not completed before 1820, long after the fall of the French Empire she was meant to defend and after the Bourbon Restoration.  Commissioned under Captain Menouvrier-Defresne, she cruised off Brazil in before returning to Brest. In 1823, she captured the Spanish merchantman Nueva Veloce Mariana before patrolling the Caribbean.

She cruised off South America again from 1828 to 1829 before being hulked in 1830. She was eventually scrapped in 1833.

Notes, citations, and references

Notes

Citations

References

Ships of the line of the French Navy
Téméraire-class ships of the line
1820 ships